Mount Troy is a mountain in the City and Borough of Juneau, Alaska, United States.

In 1950, the United States Forest Service named the mountain after John Weir Troy, the territorial governor of Alaska from 1933 to 1939.  The name was made official by the United States Board on Geographic Names in 1952 and entered into the United States Geological Survey's Geographic Names Information System on January 1, 2000.

See also
Table Top Mountain

References

Troy
Mountains of Juneau, Alaska
Troy